Roots of Empathy is a classroom program in Toronto, Canada, where infants are taken to visit elementary schools on regularly, in order to allow the schoolchildren to observe the infants' development and emotions. The project was begun in 1996 by Mary Gordon, a social entrepreneur and educator.

Method
The program consists of 27 weekly classes with a Roots of Empathy instructor throughout the school year. The program's core is a classroom visit from a neighbourhood baby and parent every three weeks, with nine visits in all. Babies are between two and four months old at the beginning of the program.

The children sit around the parent, baby and instructor and observe the baby's development and growth but also how the parent and baby interact. The instructor asks the children to reflect on their own feelings and on their classmates' displays of emotions.

Research and evaluation 
The Roots of Empathy program's effectiveness has been evaluated multiple times by independent reviewers since 2000. Randomized control trials, qualitative and quantitative, and longitudinal have been done. The results consistently show a decrease in aggression (including bullying) and an increase in sharing/inclusive/helping behaviour. Some studies show the decrease in aggression appears to last at least three years.   The organization also collects surveys every year from the children, classroom teachers, instructors and parents to evaluate the programs.

Growth
The program is available in every province of Canada. In 2007, the program expanded internationally to New Zealand and the United States (Seattle, WA). It is now in 11 countries including England, Scotland, Wales, Northern Ireland, the Republic of Ireland, Germany, Switzerland, Costa Rica and the Netherlands (fall 2018). The curriculum has been translated into French, German, Spanish and Dutch

Funding
Roots of Empathy is funded by government grants, foundation funding, and corporate and individual donations.

Recognition
In 2008, the Canadian Assembly of First Nations passed a resolution to endorse the Roots of Empathy program. In 2017, Roots of Empathy was recognized as one of the most inspiring global innovations in K–12 education by the Finnish organization HundrED.org. UpSocial selected Roots of Empathy as the winner of its social innovation competition Accelerating Change for Social Inclusion (ASCI) to address the risk to children of social exclusion.

References

 http://rootsofempathy.org/research/   
 John Wishart City Views (2008-10-25). "timestranscript.com - Roots of Empathy planting valuable seeds | John Wishart - Breaking News, New Brunswick, Canada". Timestranscript.canadaeast.com. Retrieved 2011-01-06. 
 Marilynn Vanderstaay. "The Senior Times Monthly - Montreal". Theseniortimes.com. Retrieved 2011-01-06. 
 Error: Page Not Found
 Hamilton Breaking News - Hamilton's Online Newspaper | TheSpec.com
 "Anti-bullying program aims to teach students empathy". Seattlepi.com. 2007-12-29. Retrieved 2011-01-06.
 "Babies go to school to teach". CNN.com. 2010-12-10. Retrieved 2011-01-06

External links
 

Non-profit organizations based in Toronto
Educational organizations based in Ontario